Euclysia is a genus of moths in the family Geometridae described by Warren in 1894.

Species
 Euclysia columbipennis (Walker, 1860)
 Euclysia restricta Warren, 1894

References

Geometridae